Simone Ponti (born 11 December 1989) is an Italian male rower, medal winner at senior level at the European Rowing Championships.

References

External links
 

1989 births
Living people
Italian male rowers
Rowers from Naples